KXKK (92.5 FM) is a radio station licensed to serve Park Rapids, Minnesota. Its country music format comes from the Dial Global networks. The station is owned by De La Hunt Broadcasting, licensed to EC Broadcasting.

The station was assigned the KXKK call letters by the Federal Communications Commission on May 11, 1998.

References

External links
KXKK official website
 

Radio stations in Minnesota
Country radio stations in the United States
Hubbard County, Minnesota
Radio stations established in 1998